The 2023 Six Nations Championship is the 24th Six Nations Championship, an annual rugby union tournament contested by the men's national teams of England, France, Ireland, Italy, Scotland and Wales. Unlike the Rugby World Cup, teams are not required to name a limited squad for the tournament, and may call up players freely for each match.

Note: Number of caps and players' ages are indicated as of 4 February 2023 – the tournament's opening day. For players added to a squad during the tournament, their caps and age are indicated as of the date of their call-up.

England
On 16 January 2023, England coach Steve Borthwick named a 36-man squad for the 2023 Six Nations Championship.

Head coach:  Steve Borthwick

Call-ups
On 29 January 2023, Borthwick named an updated 36-player squad, ahead of the opening fixture against Scotland on 4 February 2023, which added several players to the original squad, following injuries to Elliot Daly, Dan Kelly, Courtney Lawes, George McGuigan and Henry Slade.

On 6 February 2023, Borthwick named a revised 36-player squad for the second round fixture against Italy on 12 February 2023, which included a number of players returning from injury.

On 19 February 2023, Borthwick named an altered 36-player squad for the third round fixture against Wales on 25 February 2023, which recalled several veterans and two uncapped players.

On 28 February 2023, Borthwick named a 26-player training squad for the fallow week ahead of the fourth round fixture against France on 11 March 2023, which gave a recall to Jonny May.

On 13 March 2023, Borthwick named the final 36-player squad ahead of the last round fixture against Ireland on 18 March 2023, with new call-ups in place of Ollie Chessum and Ollie Lawrence, who withdrew because of injury.

France
On 17 January 2023, France head coach Fabien Galthié named a 42-man squad for the 2023 Six Nations Championship.

Head coach:  Fabien Galthié

Call-ups
On 29 January, Clément Castets, Baptiste Couilloud and Gabin Villière were called-up to the squad, while Dany Priso, Thomas Jolmès and Léo Coly were released. Alexandre Roumat also replaced an injured Paul Boudehent on the same day. 

On 30 January, Thomas Jolmès was immediately called back after Yacouba Camara withdrew injured following Montpellier's game at Toulouse the previous day. 

On 19 February, Jonathan Danty, Ibrahim Diallo, Thomas Lavault and Yoan Tanga were called up ahead of the third round match against Scotland.

On 3 March, Dorian Aldegheri, Léo Berdeu, Thomas Jolmès, Enzo Reybier and Bastien Vergnes-Taillefer were called up ahead of the final two rounds against England and Wales.

Ireland
On 19 January 2023, Ireland coach Andy Farrell named a 37-man squad for the 2023 Six Nations Championship.
(Caps updated 19 March 2023)

Head coach:  Andy Farrell

Call-ups
On 30 January, Tom Stewart was called up as injury cover at hooker, with Rónan Kelleher an injury concern ahead of the tournament.

On 6 February, Michael Milne and Caolin Blade were called up as injury cover, and Roman Salanoa was retained after being called up for injury cover.

On 20 February, Scott Penny , Kieran Treadwell and Joey Carbery were called up as injury cover.

On 3 March, Nick Timoney and Ciaran Frawley were called up.

Italy
On 10 January, Italy head coach Kieran Crowley announced an initial 34-man squad for their opening two matches of the tournament against France on 5 February and England on 12 February.

Head coach:  Kieran Crowley

Call-ups
On 29 January, Italy reduced the squad for the first two rounds and included call-ups for Riccardo Favretto, Paolo Garbisi and Edoardo Iachizzi. At the same time it also saw the withdrawal of Marco Fuser, Matteo Nocera, Mirco Spagnolo and Andrea Zambonin.

On 20 February, Jake Polledri was announced to have withdrawn from the squad due to injury, whilst Paolo Buonfiglio, Andrea Zambonin and Giovanni Montemauri were called up ahead of round 3.

On 8 March, Italy named an updated squad ahead of the final two rounds which included the call ups for Page Relo, Marco Zanon and Simone Gesi.

Scotland
On 17 January 2023, Scotland coach Gregor Townsend named a 40-man squad for the 2023 Six Nations Championship.

Head coach:  Gregor Townsend

Call-ups
On 7 February 2023, Andy Christie returned to his club due to injury and Scott Cummings joined up with the squad as his replacement.

On 7 March 2023, Rory Darge joined up with the squad ahead of the fourth round.

On 14 March 2023, Stuart Hogg and Finn Russell withdrew from the squad due to injury and Charlie Savala was called up to the squad as cover.

Wales
Wales coach Warren Gatland named a 37-man squad for the tournament on 17 January 2023.

Head coach:  Warren Gatland

Call-ups
On 24 January 2023, Scott Baldwin was called up to replace Dewi Lake.

References

squads
2023 Squads